Venkateswara Temple is a Hindu temple situated at Ramenahalli in Mundargi taluk of Gadag district in the Indian state of Karnataka. The Temple is dedicated to Venkateswara, a form of Vishnu. Hammigi is located south of district headquarters Gadag and Taluka headquarters Mundargi.

References

Hindu temples in Gadag district
Vishnu temples
Villages in Gadag district